Catocala parta, the mother underwing, is a moth of the family Erebidae. The species was first described by Achille Guenée in 1852. It is found in North America from Nova Scotia south to Maryland and Kentucky, west to southern Saskatchewan and Alberta, western Montana, and Utah.
The wingspan is 70–78 mm. Adults are on wing from August to September depending on the location.

The larvae feed on Populus and Salix species.

References

External links

parta
Moths of North America
Moths described in 1852